This is a list of episodes for British comedy drama web series Corner Shop Show. The series is created by Islah Abdur-Rahman and consists of continuous episodes uploaded on his YouTube channel CornerShopShow, following the adventures of a young man's transition to fill his father's shoes after becoming the custodian of a family business. In August 2014, Episodes 1 and 2 were removed from YouTube but are available on Dailymotion because Abdur-Rahman did not think they had the same production level as Episode 3 onwards.

Episodes

Season 1 (2014–2015)

Season 2 (2017-2019)

Spin-offs and specials

List of Corner Shop Express episodes

Season 1 (2015-2019)

Grand Theft Auto skits

Christmas and New Years 2016 special

Valentine's Day 2017 special

References

External links

Corner Shop Show